Jules Antoine François Auguste Pellechet (13 October 1829 - 18 September 1903) was a French architect, notable for his designs for buildings in France, Italy, and the United Kingdom and as an architect in the artillery technical section of France's Ministry of War.

Life
Born in Paris to the architect Auguste Pellechet (1789-1871), he studied at the École polytechnique and the École des beaux-arts  (class of 1850) in the studio of Abel Blouet. In 1869 he became a member of the société centrale des architectes français and in 1899 was made a Chevalier of the Légion d’honneur. He died in Paris. His daughter Marie began compilation of Catalogue général des incunables des bibliothèques publiques de France.

Selected designs

Paris
 Hôtel de Sers, 41 avenue Pierre-Ier-de-Serbie.
 Hôtel d'Essling, 8 rue Jean-Goujon, 1866.
 Hôtel Menier, 4 avenue Ruysdaël, 1875.
 Extension to the hôtel Grimod de La Reynière, rue Boissy-d'Anglas, 1889.
 Hôtel de Barbentane, 30 quai de Billy (attributed)

Other
 Central artillery store, ministry of war
 Château du Plessis, Blanzy, 1872 (neo-Gothic modifications to the curtain walls, skylights, farmyard, unrealised design for the tour Magdeleine; all for the comte de Barbentane)
 Châtaigneraie de Retz, Chambourcy, around 1880.
 Bowes Museum, Barnard Castle, County Durham, United Kingdom, 1869-1871.
 Villa Huffer, Via Nazionale, Rome, Italy, 1880-1883 (base of the Bank of Italy).

Works
 Jules Pellechet, Lettres d'Italie : 1856-1857, publiées par Marie et Catherine Pellechet, Paris, 1894, II+202 p

References

1829 births
1903 deaths
19th-century French architects
Chevaliers of the Légion d'honneur
École Polytechnique alumni